The Alpine foothills, or Prealps, may refer generally to any foothills at the base of the Alps in Europe. They are the transition zone between the High Alps and  the Swiss Plateau and the Bavarian Alpine Foreland in the north, as well as to the Pannonian Basin (Alpokalja) in the east, the Padan Plain in the south and the Rhone Valley in the west.

Classification
The Alpine foothills comprise:
The French Prealps
Savoy Prealps
Dauphiné Prealps
Provence Prealps
The Swiss Prealps
The Northern Prealps, part of the Northern Limestone Alps:
Bavarian Prealps in southeastern Germany
Salzburg Prealps, part of the Salzkammergut Mountains in Austria
Upper Austrian Prealps 
Lower Austrian Prealps, leading to the Vienna Woods
The Southeastern Prealps, borderline of the Alps to the Pannonian Basin in Austria and Slovenia:
Prealps East of the Mur
Lavanttal Alps
Styrian Prealps
Slovenian Prealps, Pohorje
The Southern or Italian Prealps, usually divided into:
Julian Prealps
Venetian Prealps 
Bergamasque Prealps
Lugano Prealps
Brescia and Garda Prealps

See also
Operation Zone of the Alpine Foothills – a territory in Italy occupied by Nazi Germany in World War II

Notes 

Foothills